Don Betz is an American retired academic administrator, serving as both the University of Central Oklahoma (2011–2019) and Northeastern State University's presidents (2008–2011).

Background and career
Before becoming President of Northeastern State, he served as Chancellor at the University of Wisconsin–River Falls from 2005 to 2008. From 1999 to 2005, Betz was Provost, Vice President for Academic Affairs and Professor of Political Science at the University of Central Oklahoma in Edmond, Oklahoma. He served as the Provost and Vice President for Academic Affairs at Palmer College in Davenport, Iowa from 1994 to 1999. On August 1, 2011 Betz began his tenure as the 20th President of the University of Central Oklahoma.

Betz also worked for and with the United Nations on issues pertaining to the Middle East from 1982 through 2003.

Betz holds a BA in Political Science from the University of San Francisco and an MA and PhD in International Studies from the University of Denver.

On June 22, 2018 Betz declared his intention to retire as president of the University of Central Oklahoma at the end of the 2018–19 academic year.

References

Chancellors of the University of Wisconsin–River Falls
Presidents of Northeastern State University
Presidents of the University of Central Oklahoma
Living people
University of Denver alumni
University of San Francisco alumni
1945 births